Ewan McVicar is a Scottish DJ and music producer. He came to prominence with the release of his debut single "Tell Me Something Good" in 2021.

Career 
On 1 May 2020, McVicar released his EP Street Rave. In 2021, his version of "Tell Me Something Good" reached the top 20 of the UK Singles Chart. In February 2022, McVicar released his EP Movin' On Over.

Personal life 
McVicar is from Ayr, Scotland. He studied at Belmont Academy and graduated in teaching from University of the West of Scotland (UWS).

References 

Scottish DJs
Scottish record producers
Electronic dance music DJs

Alumni of the University of the West of Scotland